Irene von Meyendorff (6 June 1916 – 28 September 2001) was a Russian-born German-British actress.

Biography
Irene von Meyendorff was of Baltic German origin, born in 1916 in Tallinn (then Reval, Russia), Estonia as the eldest child of a German-Baltic aristocrat. Her birth name and title was Baroness Irene Isabella Margarete Pauline Caecila von Meyendorff. In the early 1930s she moved to Berlin to work as a cutter in the UFA film studios of Babelsberg. Her beauty soon landed her first film roles and the attention of Joseph Goebbels. Being purported to represent the purest ideal of Aryan beauty, the actress portrayed mostly noble patricians. The sale of her promotional postcards shows that she was the number one pin-up girl among the German Army during World War II.

She was cast by propaganda director Veit Harlan twice: in 1944 in Opfergang and in 1945 in Kolberg. The production of these elaborately produced colour films was strictly supervised by Goebbels; Kolberg was the most expensive film ever produced in Germany (with the budget of 8.5 million Reichsmarks), intended to celebrate the 12th anniversary of Adolf Hitler's ascent to power, opening on 30 January 1945. In 1960 she met British actor James Robertson Justice, fell in love with him and left her third husband Pit Severin, a journalist from Hamburg, to follow Justice to Britain. She all but gave up acting, returning only briefly in such films as the costume drama Mayerling (1968).

She became a British citizen in 1967, and changed her name to Irina. A series of strokes, starting in 1968, gradually prevented James Robertson Justice from working again and led to his eventual bankruptcy. Earning her living as a teacher at a local language school, Irina nursed him until his death in 1975. After 14 years of living together, they were finally married on his deathbed in hospital three days before he died.

In 1990, she married his best friend and their neighbour, millionaire and philanthropist — heir to shoe sellers Russell & Bromley — Frederick Keith ("Toby") Bromley. At age 70, she sailed to the Arctic and the Orinoco River. On 28 September 2001 she died in Hampshire, aged 85. She was predeceased by her son, Andreas Zahler (1940–1985). She was survived by her granddaughter, Rebecca (b. 1984).

Filmography
 1936 The Last Four on Santa Cruz
 1936 Verräter
 1938 Travelling People 
 1938 Es leuchten die Sterne
 1938 Zwei Frauen
 1939 Wibbel the Tailor 
 1939 Linen from Ireland 
 1939 We Danced Around the World
 1940 Casanova heiratet
 1941 
 1941 Was geschah in dieser Nacht ?
 1942 Einmal der liebe Herrgott sein
 1942 Whom the Gods Love
 1943 Johann
 1944 Um 9 kommt Harald
 1944 Opfergang
 1944 Philharmoniker
 1944 
 1945 Kolberg
 1948 Film Without a Title
 1948 Der Apfel ist ab
 1949 1x1 der Ehe
 1950 The Orplid Mystery
 1950 A Rare Lover
 1952 Poison in the Zoo 
 1953 The Cousin from Nowhere
 1954 Portrait of an Unknown Woman
 1954 Captain Wronski
 1955 Versuchung
 1955 Holiday in Tyrol
 1956 Three Birch Trees on the Heath
 1957 
 1960 In Namen einer Mutter
 1960 The Ambassador
 1960 Das Paradies (TV)
 1965 Hell Is Empty
 1965 Long Legs, Long Fingers
 1968 Mayerling

References

External links

1916 births
2001 deaths
Actresses from Tallinn
People from the Governorate of Estonia
Baltic-German people

German emigrants to the United Kingdom
German film actresses
20th-century German actresses
British film actresses
Naturalised citizens of the United Kingdom
20th-century Estonian actresses
Estonian emigrants to Germany